Club100 is a UK-based "hire kart" karting championship. Senior/Junior karts use identical BirelART chassis, Rotax Junior Max 2 stroke engines and Dunlop KE1 tyres, while the Cadet championship use a smaller BirelART chassis, a smaller Rotax Micro Max 2 stroke engine and Dunlop SL3 tyres, these are provided by the club to an equal standard, putting all competitors on a level playing field.

History 

The first Club100 championship was held in 1993. Initially it was a 6-round sprint championship held at Buckmore Park and has since grown into a multi-event series held all over the country at some of the UK's top karting circuits.

In 1995, the sprint championship was split up into two weight categories. 1997 saw the creation of the first endurance championship and this has grown into 4 separate championships for rookies, intermediates, clubman and premier level teams. 2004 saw the creation of the Clubman endurance championship that was a level between intermediate and premier level. In 2007, the sprints were split up again and a separate premier championship was created to accommodate the monopoly the top drivers held. The first winter championship was also held that year with all rounds being held at Rye House. In 2011, the sprint championship was split up further and 2 clubman championships were created (heavyweight and lightweight classes) as a stepping stone to the premier series. The format of the Open championship was changed from 3 hour endurance races for teams to a 60-minute format for individuals or teams of 2. The Advance Leisure series moved to a similar format with two 30 minute races. 2020 brought the Young Drivers Championship, which was a big success; it brought along two classes the Lightweight and Super Lightweight Young Driver Championship, this championship was open to people 14 - 18 years old. In 2022, a couple new classes were added/rebranded; the Lightweight and Super Lightweight Young Drivers Championship was rebranded into the Junior Lightweights, and Junior Super Lightweights. The two new classes are the Cadet, and Super Cadet classes. Both of these new classes have 12 minute practice, 10 minute qualifying, and 2 12 minute races. The Junior classes have an age range of 14 - 18 years old. Whereas, the Cadet class has an age range of 7 - 10 years old, and the Super Cadet class has an age range of 10 - 13 years old. For the 2023 season the Cadet and Super Cadet Championships have been switched to the Cadet Lightweight, and Cadet Super Lightweight classes. The Cadet Lightweights have a minimum weight of 45kg and an age range of 7-13 years old. Whereas Cadet Super Lightweight have a minimum weight of 35kg and an age range of 7-13 years old.

Since 1999 the club has been managed by John Vigor. In 2006, he bought all the rights to Club100 from Playscape and moved the base of operations from Streatham in London to Rye House in Hoddesdon. In 2011 the base was moved to Sittingbourne, just next to the Bayford Meadows kart circuit.

Junior Super Lightweight Champions 

 2022 Daniel Munro

Junior Lightweight Champions 

 2022 Anthony Amato

Cadet Champions 

 2022 Ilya Velicko

Super Cadet Champions 

 2022 Benjamin Hamilton

Super Final Sprint Champions 
2020 Steve Hicks

Club100 Experince (Novice) 

 2022 Harry Chapman

Club100 Experience (Intermediate) 

 2022 Rhianna Purcocks

Club100 Experience (Heavy) 

 2022 TBD

Premier Sprint Champions 
2007 Marc Craddock 
2008 Phil Ingram
2009 Jamie Jakins
2010 Chris Powell
2011 Kieran McCullugh
2012 Chris Powell
2013 Chris Powell
2014 Ian Blake
2015 Anwar Beroual Smith
2016 Steve Brown
2017 Joe Holmes
2018 Joe Holmes

Lightweight Clubman Champions 
2011 Jonny Goddard
2012 Andrew Johnson
2013 Jack Harding

Heavyweight Clubman Champions 
2011 Ian Blake
2012 Trevor Randall
2013 Dan Hoy

Clubman Sprint Champions 
2014 Steve Crutchley
2015 James Small
2017 Harry Neale
2018 James Taylor

Lightweight Sprint Champions 
1993 Andy Laid
1994 Andy Laid
1995 Malcolm Smith
1996 Andy Laid
1997 Russ Stephens
1998 Marc Craddock
1999 Marc Craddock
2000 Lee Pilcher
2001 Luigi Mazza
2002 Trevor Randall
2003 Marc Craddock
2004 Marc Craddock
2005 Marc Craddock
2006 Ben Yeomans
2007 Jon Pethick 
2008 Parmveer Nijjar
2009 Lee Kemp
2010 Dan Gore
2011 Andrew Johnson
2012 Peter Cole
2013 James Reveler
2014 James Small
2015 Daniel Healey
2016 Tom Golding
2017 Darri Simms
2018 Mike Noon
2019 Ed Barrs
2020 Ed Barrs
2021 Jack O'Neill
2022 Fraser Brunton

Heavyweight Sprint Champions 
1995 Steve Dart
1996 Russ Stephens
1997 Mark Terry
1998 Trevor Randall
1999 Rob Hart
2000 Rob Hart
2001 James Winslow
2002 Brian Trott
2003 Paul Hicks
2004 Brian Trott
2005 Brian Trott
2006 Jamie Jakins
2007 Marc Laukam 
2008 Will Gibson
2009 Michael Roots
2010 Dave Pethers
2011 Dan Hoy
2012 Gerard Moore
2013 Anwar Beroual Smith
2014 Sam Fisher
2015 Jonny Elliott
2016 Joe Holmes
2017 Adam Wright
2018 Tim Hill
2019 Joe Holmes
2020 Joe Holmes
2021 Joe Holmes
2022 Anwar Beroual-Smith

Super Heavyweight Sprint Champion 
2019 Richard Allen
2020 Richard Allen
2021 Bill Taylor
2022 Bill Taylor

Lightweight SP60 Champions 
2019 Jack O'Neill 
2020 Jack O'Neill
2021 Jack O'Neill
2022 Jack O’Neill

Heavyweight SP60 Champions 
2019 Andrew Hall Jr. 
2020 Anwar Beroual-Smith
2021 Daniel Brewer
2022 Anwar Beroual-Smith

Lightweight Elite Champions 
2000 Marc Craddock 
2001 Marc Mercer
2002 Trevor Randall

Heavyweight Elite Champions 
2000 Paul Hicks
2001 Stuart Symonds
2002 James Winslow

Winter Series Champions

European Endurance Champions

Elite Endurance Champions

Premier Endurance Champions

Clubman Endurance Champions

Intermediate Endurance Champions

Rookie Endurance Champions

Open Endurance Champions

O Plate Champions

Spin-off series
BPKDC Elite Series (2009–2015)
British Universities Karting Championship (2001–present)
Advance Leisure (2003–present)
Spiros 60 (2009–2013)
UK Challenge (2002-2005)
City Challenge (2004)
Nationwide Series (2014–present)

Club100 have also been the promoters of the UK Easykart championship since its inception in 2007.

Notable drivers
Damon Hill 1996 Formula 1 World Champion 
James Winslow 2008 Australian Formula 3 Champion 
Trevor Fowell, 2008 Caterham Academy Champion; 2009 Caterham Roadsport-B Champion; 2010 Caterham Superlight R300 Champion.

References
Club100 Website
Karting News
Karting Magazine
Discussed on Ten Tenths Motorsport
Reporting on one driver's progress in the series

Notes

Kart racing series
Kart racing organizations